The Stockholm Center for Freedom (SCF) is an advocacy organization founded in 2017 by Turkish journalists allegedly linked to the Gülen movement. SCF is managed by Abdullah Bozkurt and is headquartered in Stockholm, Sweden. The group moved to Sweden after the government crackdown on press freedom in Turkey after the deadly 2016 failed coup d'état attempt, which the government blamed on Gülenists. The group is mainly focused on issues related to human rights and press freedom in Turkey, although it occasionally reports on other countries as well. It has issued a number of reports in English and Turkish on the human rights situation in Turkey.

Alleged links to Gülen movement 
SCF has been accused in Turkish media of having links to the Gülen movement, an organization designated as a terrorist organization by Turkey. It being founded by Abdullah Bozkurt, a former bureau chief for the English-language edition of Gülen-aligned Zaman newspaper and a fugitive accused of having ties to the Gülen movement, are part of the allegations in Turkey.

References

External links
 Official website

Human rights in Turkey
Human rights organizations based in Sweden
Organizations established in 2017